Andrej Dujella (born May 21, 1966 in Pula) is a Croatian professor of mathematics at the University of Zagreb and a fellow of the Croatian Academy of Sciences and Arts.

Life
Born in Pula, a native of Zadar, Dujella took part in the International Mathematical Olympiad, where he won a bronze medal in 1984.
He received his M.Sc. and Ph.D. in mathematics from the University of Zagreb with a dissertation titled "Generalized Diophantine–Davenport problem". His main area of research is number theory, in particular Diophantine equations, elliptic curves, and applications of number theory in cryptography. Dujella is author of the monograph "Number Theory" (translated from Croatian).

Dujella's main contribution to number theory is in connection to  Diophantine m-tuples.
Dujella has shown that there exists no Diophantine 6-tuple and that there exist at most a finite number of Diophantine 5-tuples.  He applied Diophantine tuples to construct elliptic curves with high rank. In 1998, Dujella and Attila Pethő introduced congruence method to obtain lower bound for number of Diophantine 5-tuples.

References

1966 births
Croatian mathematicians
Members of the Croatian Academy of Sciences and Arts
Living people
Number theorists
International Mathematical Olympiad participants
Faculty of Science, University of Zagreb alumni
Academic staff of the University of Zagreb